Ahisamakh (lit. Brother of support) may refer to:

Ahisamakh, Israel, a moshav in central Israel
Ahisamach (Bible), the father of Aholiab according to Exodus 31:6, Exodus 35:34, and Exodus 38:23